Stiff-person syndrome (SPS), also known as stiff-man syndrome (SMS), is a rare neurologic disorder of unclear cause characterized by progressive rigidity and stiffness. The stiffness primarily affects the truncal muscles and is superimposed by spasms, resulting in postural deformities. Chronic pain, impaired mobility, and lumbar hyperlordosis are common symptoms.

SPS occurs in about one in a million people and is most commonly found in middle-aged people. A small minority of patients have the paraneoplastic variety of the condition. Variants of the condition, such as stiff-limb syndrome which primarily affects a specific limb, are often seen.

SPS was first described in 1956. Diagnostic criteria were proposed in the 1960s and refined two decades later. In the 1990s and 2000s the roles of antibodies in the condition became clearer. SPS patients generally have glutamic acid decarboxylase (GAD) antibodies, which seldom occur in the general population. In addition to blood tests for GAD, electromyography tests can help confirm the condition's presence.

Benzodiazepine-class drugs are the most common treatment; they are used for symptom relief from stiffness. Other common treatments include baclofen, intravenous immunoglobin and rituximab. There is a limited but encouraging therapeutic experience of haematopoietic stem cell transplantation for SPS.

Signs and symptoms
Stiff-person syndrome (SPS) is often separated into several subtypes, based on the cause and progression of the disease.

There are three clinical classifications of SPS

 Classic SPS, associated with other autoimmune conditions and usually GAD-positive;
 Partial SPS variants
 Progressive encephalomyelitis with rigidity and myoclonus (PERM).

Around 70% of those with SPS have the "classic" form of the disease. People with classic SPS typically first experience intermittent tightness or aching in the muscles of the trunk. These muscles repeatedly and involuntarily contract, causing them to grow and rigidify. Eventually, rigidified muscles reduce the affected person's range of motion, slow their voluntary movements, and may cause them to have abnormal posture, particularly lumbar hyperlordosis (a distinctive curve in the lower back). Rigid trunk muscles can also prevent the chest and abdomen from expanding, causing shortness of breath and early satiety. In many people with SPS, muscle rigidity eventually progresses from the trunk to the limbs – first affecting muscles closest to the trunk, then further. Stiffened limbs can affect a person's balance and gait, causing awkward 'statue-like' falls where the affected person cannot put out their arms to soften the impact. Alongside growing stiffness, many with SPS develop bouts of muscle spasms that are triggered by sudden movements as well as feeling upset or startled. Spasms are sometimes accompanied by elevated blood pressure, heart rate, body temperature, and sweating. Some experience chronic muscle pain.

The muscle stiffness initially fluctuates, sometimes for days or weeks, but eventually begins to consistently impair mobility. As the disease progresses, patients sometimes become unable to walk or bend. Chronic pain is common and worsens over time, but sometimes acute pain occurs as well. Stress, cold weather, and infections lead to an increase in symptoms, and sleep decreases them.

SPS patients experience superimposed spasms and extreme sensitivity to touch and sound. These spasms primarily occur in the proximal limb and axial muscles. Spasms usually last for minutes and can recur over hours. Attacks of spasms are unpredictable and are often caused by fast movements, emotional distress, or sudden sounds or touches. In rare cases, facial muscles, hands, feet, and the chest can be affected and unusual eye movements and vertigo occur. There are brisk stretch reflexes and clonus occurs in patients. Late in the disease's progression, hypnagogic myoclonus can occur.

In addition to their physical symptoms, many with SPS experience neurological and psychiatric disorders. Some with SPS have various neurological disorders that affect physical reflexes, and the movement of the eyes. Some also experience anxiety, depression, alcohol use disorders, and phobias – particularly agoraphobia. Most patients are psychologically normal and respond reasonably to their situations. 

A minority of people with SPS experience "partial" SPS, also called "stiff limb syndrome", where the muscle contractions and stiffness are limited to the limbs, or sometimes a single limb. This syndrome develops into full SPS about 25% of the time. The stiffness begins in one limb and remains most prominent there. Sphincter and brainstem issues often occur with stiff-limb syndrome. 

Progressive encephalomyelitis with rigidity and myoclonus, another variant of the condition, includes symptoms of SPS with brainstem issues, autonomic disturbances, and myoclonus. In some cases, the limbic system is affected as well. Most patients have upper motor neuron issues and autonomic disturbances.

Around 5% of those with SPS experience the symptoms as a paraneoplastic syndrome – a result of a tumor elsewhere in the body releasing bioactive molecules. Paraneoplastic SPS can affect either a single limb, or the trunk and limbs together.

Causes
Patients with SPS generally have high glutamic acid decarboxylase (GAD) antibody levels in their blood. About 80 percent of SPS patients have GAD antibodies, compared with about one percent of the general population. The overwhelming majority of people who have GAD antibodies do not develop SPS, indicating that systemic synthesis of the antibody is not the sole cause of SPS. GAD, a presynaptic autoantigen, is generally thought to play a key role in the condition, but exact details of the way that autoantibodies affect SPS patients are not known. Most SPS patients with high-titer GAD antibodies also have antibodies that inhibit GABA-receptor-associated protein (GABARAP). Autoantibodies against amphiphysin and gephyrin are also sometimes found in SPS patients. The antibodies appear to interact with antigens in the brain neurons and the spinal cord synapses, causing a functional blockade of the inhibitory neurotransmitter gamma-aminobutyric acid (GABA). This leads to GABA impairment, which probably causes the stiffness and spasms that characterize SPS. There are low GABA levels in the motor cortexes of SPS patients. 

It is not known why GAD autoimmunity occurs in SPS patients, and whether SPS qualifies as a neuro-autoimmune disorder has been questioned. It is also unknown whether these antibodies are pathogenic. The level of GAD antibody titers found in SPS patients does not correlate with disease severity, indicating that these titer levels do not need to be monitored. It has not been proven that GAD antibodies are the sole cause of SPS, and the possibility exists that they are a marker or an epiphenomenon of the condition's cause.

In SPS patients, motor unit neurons fire involuntarily in a way that resembles a normal contraction. Motor unit potentials fire while the patient is at rest, particularly in the muscles which are stiff. The excessive firing of motor neurons may be caused by malfunctions in spinal and supra-segmental inhibitory networks that utilize GABA. Involuntary actions show up as voluntary on EMG scans: even when the patient tries to relax, there are agonist and antagonist contractions.

In a minority of patients with SPS, breast, ovarian, or lung cancer manifests paraneoplastically as proximal muscle stiffness. These cancers are associated with the synaptic proteins amphiphysin and gephyrin. Paraneoplastic SPS with amphiphysin antibodies and breast adenocarcinoma tend to occur together. These patients tend not to have GAD antibodies. Passive transfer of SPS by plasma injection has been demonstrated in paraneoplastic SPS but not in classical SPS.

There is evidence of genetic influence on SPS risk. The HLA class II locus makes patients susceptible to the condition. Most SPS patients have the DQB1* 0201 allele. This allele is also associated with type 1 diabetes.

Diagnosis
SPS is diagnosed by evaluating clinical findings and excluding other conditions. There is no specific laboratory test that confirms its presence. Due to the rarity and varied symptoms of SPS, most affected by the disease wait several years before they are correctly diagnosed.

The presence of antibodies against GAD is the best indication of the condition that can be detected by blood and cerebrospinal fluid (CSF) testing. Anti-GAD65 is found in about 80 percent of SPS patients. Anti-thyroid, anti-intrinsic factor, anti-nuclear, anti-RNP, and anti-gliadin are also often found in blood tests. Electromyography (EMG) demonstrates involuntary motor unit firing in SPS patients. EMG can confirm the SPS diagnosis by noting spasms in distant muscles as a result of subnoxious stimulation of cutaneous or mixed nerves. Responsiveness to diazepam helps confirm that the patient has SPS, as this drug will decrease stiffness and motor unit firing.

The same general criteria are used to diagnose paraneoplastic SPS as for the normal form of the condition. Once SPS is diagnosed, poor response to conventional therapies and the presence of cancer indicate that it may be paraneoplastic. CT scans are indicated for SPS patients who respond poorly to therapy to determine if cancer is the cause.

A variety of conditions have similar symptoms to SPS, including myelopathies, dystonias, spinocerebellar degenerations, primary lateral sclerosis, neuromyotonia, and some psychogenic disorders. Tetanus, neuroleptic malignant syndrome, malignant hyperpyrexia, chronic spinal interneuronitis, serotonin syndrome, multiple sclerosis, Parkinson's disease, and Isaacs syndrome should also be excluded.

Patients' fears and phobias often incorrectly lead doctors to think their symptoms are psychogenic, and they are sometimes suspected of malingering. It takes an average of six years after the onset of symptoms before the disease is diagnosed.

Treatment
There is no evidence-based criterion for treating SPS, and there have been no large, controlled trials of treatments for the condition. The rarity of the disease complicates efforts to establish guidelines. However, treatments can either be categorized as GABAergic or Immuno-Therapy.

GABAergic Therapy 
GABAA agonists, usually diazepam but sometimes other benzodiazepines, are the primary treatment for SPS. Drugs that increase GABA activity alleviate muscle stiffness caused by a lack of GABAergic tone. They increase pathways that are dependent upon GABA and have muscle relaxant and anticonvulsant effects, often providing symptom relief. Because the condition worsens over time, patients generally require increased dosages, leading to more side effects.

Benzodiazepines 
Benzodiazepines (such as diazepam and clonazepam) are psychoactive drugs that enhance a GABA neurotransmitter's effect at the GABA receptor in enhancing inhibitory circuits. The drug has been used as sedative, muscle relaxant, and anticonvulsant. Patients with classic or partial SMS and GAD-65-positive antibody have shown improvement in stiffness and spasm symptoms with long-term benzodiazepine treatment. However, this change cannot solely be attributed to monotherapy of benzodiazepine as adjunct medications were also commonly administered. Currently, diazepam is the mainstay of therapy. Most patients respond well to diazepam.

Oral and Intrathecal Baclofen 
Baclofen, a GABAB agonist, is generally used when individuals taking high doses of benzodiazepines have high side effects. In some cases, it has shown improvements in electrophysiological and muscle stiffness when administered intravenously. Intrathecal baclofen administration may not have long-term benefits though, and there are potential serious side effects.

Levetiracetam (LEV) 
A 2008 small (n=3) single-blind, placebo-controlled study where participating patients were treated with oral LEV of 500 mg twice daily. The study noted that showed that the patients had improvement in axial rigidity and disappearance of the paroxysmal respiratory arrests within three days after starting therapy. A similar improvement was noted in the other two patients with a marked reduction in legs' stiffness and difficulty walking. On LEV treatment, all patients improved as assessed by all outcome measures. In particular, at EMG recordings, patients relaxed their musculature better. However, no long-term studies on LEV on patients with SPS have been done.

Pregabalin 
Pregabalin works by inhibiting calcium influx and subsequent release of excitatory neurotransmitters, including glutamate and norepinephrine. As a possible mechanism of action in SPS, pregabalin might have compensated for the imbalance between inhibitory and excitatory intracortical circuits. The prolongation of the GABA-B supports this hypothesis-mediated cortical silent period (CSP) after pregabalin introduction.

Propofol 
A 2020 review article by Ortiz, Ghani, Cox, and Tambo, noted a case report, where a SPS patient reporting persistent, severe symptoms and taking high-dose benzodiazepines, baclofen, corticosteroids, LEV, IVIG, and IV ethanol.  After that, the patient received a small dose of propofol, which improved the patient's reported symptoms. Additionally, the authors documented a patient with stiff-limb syndrome (a variant of SPS) with refractory therapy who also responded well to propofol.

The mechanism by which propofol interacts in the nervous system is not entirely understood. Nevertheless, it is suggested that it might be related to increased GABAergic activity in the brain. As it is unrealistic to have a patient with a long-term therapy to propofol, the authors suggest that propofol could be used as a bridge therapy to a more permanent intervention in patients with SPS.

Immunotherapy

Rituximab 
Rituximab is a genetically engineered monoclonal antibody directed against CD20, which causes a sustained depletion of B cells and has demonstrated promising results in several autoimmune neurological diseases.

Tacrolimus 
Tacrolimus belongs to the same class of medication as cyclosporine (calcineurin inhibitor) but is more potent. Tacrolimus inhibits the activity of T cells by decreasing the levels of IL-2. leading to a reduction of activation of B cells to produce antibodies. A small (n=2) study in 2013 showed that patients treated with tacrolimus and additional immunotherapies, after four weeks, reported improvement in their symptoms and a reduction of antibody titers. T helper cells. If the T helper cells can conduct their function, there will be less activation of B cells to produce antibodies.

Intravenous Immunoglobulin (IVIG)Therapy 
Intravenous immune globulin has been found to be a "well-tolerated and effective" therapy. Intravenous immunoglobin is the best second-line treatment for SPS. It often decreases stiffness and improves quality of life and startle reflex. It is generally safe, but there are possible serious side effects, and it is expensive. The European Federation of Neurological Societies suggests it be used when disabled patients do not respond well to diazepam and baclofen.

Plasma Exchange (Plasmapheresis) Therapy 
Plasma exchange, or plasmapheresis, has been shown to benefit patients who do not respond to first-line therapy, specifically beneficial for patients with anti-GAD65 positive SPS.

Other Therapies 
Botulinum toxin has been used to treat SPS, but it does not appear to have long-term benefits and has potential serious side effects. In paraneoplastic cases, tumors must be managed in order for the condition to be contained.

Opiates are sometimes used to treat severe pain, but they may exacerbate symptoms.

Hematopoietic stem cell transplantation (HSCT) with high intensity conditioning protocol has been performed in a few cases with severe anti-GAD positive SPS, resulting in clinical remission. In carefully selected cases of severe, treatment refractory SPS, HSCT may be an effective therapeutic option.

Prognosis
The progression of SPS depends on whether it is a typical or abnormal form of the condition and the presence of comorbidities.  Early recognition and neurological treatment can limit its progression. SPS is generally responsive to treatment, but the condition usually progresses and stabilizes periodically. Even with treatment, quality of life generally declines as stiffness precludes many activities. Some patients require mobility aids due to the risk of falls. About 65 percent of SPS patients are unable to function independently. About ten percent of SPS patients require intensive care at some point; sudden death occurs in about the same number of patients. These deaths are usually caused by metabolic acidosis or an autonomic crisis.

Epidemiology
SPS is estimated to have a prevalence of about one or two per million people. It affects women up to three times as frequently as men. In the United Kingdom, 119 cases were identified between 2000 and 2005. It does not predominantly occur in any racial or ethnic group. SPS can start at any age, though it most frequently occurs in people in their 40s. About 35 percent of SPS patients have type I diabetes.

History
SPS was first described by Moersch and Woltman in 1956. Their description of the disease was based on 14 cases that they had observed over 32 years. Using electromyography, they noted that motor-unit firing suggested that voluntary muscle contractions were occurring in their patients. Previously, cases of SPS had been dismissed as psychogenic problems. Moersch and Woltman initially called the condition "stiff-man syndrome", but the first female patient was confirmed in 1958 and a young boy was confirmed to have it in 1960. Clinical diagnostic criteria were developed by Gordon et al. in 1967. They observed "persistent tonic contraction reflected in constant firing, even at rest" after providing patients with muscle relaxants and examining them with electromyography. In 1989, criteria for an SPS diagnosis were adopted that included episodic axial stiffness, progression of stiffness, lordosis, and triggered spasms. The name of the disease was shifted from "stiff-man syndrome" to the gender-neutral "stiff-person syndrome" in 1991.

In 1963, it was determined that diazepam helped alleviate symptoms of SPS. Corticosteroids were first used to treat the condition in 1988, and plasma exchange was first applied the following year. The first use of intravenous immunoglobulin to treat the condition came in 1994.

In 1988, Solimena et al. discovered that autoantibodies against GAD played a key role in SPS. Two years later, Solimena found the antibodies in 20 out of 33 patients examined. In the late 1980s, it was also demonstrated that the serum of SPS patients would bind to GABAergic neurons. In 2006, the role of GABARAP in SPS was discovered. The first case of paraneoplastic SPS was found in 1975. In 1993, antiamphiphysin was shown to play a role in paraneoplastic SPS, and seven years later antigephyrin was also found to be involved in the condition.

In December 2022, singer Céline Dion announced that she is suffering from this syndrome, resulting in cancelled performances.

See also 
 Satoyoshi syndrome
 Hyperekplexia

References

Bibliography

External links 

 Stiff-Person Syndrome Information Page at NINDS

Extrapyramidal and movement disorders
Ailments of unknown cause
Syndromes affecting the nervous system
Rare syndromes